Clay County High School is a high school in Manchester, Clay County, Kentucky, United States. It is the only high school in the county.

Notable alumni 
 Bert T. Combs
 Richie Farmer

References

External links 
 Official Web Page

Public high schools in Kentucky
Schools in Clay County, Kentucky